The River Bela is a short (approximately ) river in the county of Cumbria, England. It is in the ancient county of Westmorland.

The river is formed by the confluence of Peasey Beck and Stainton Beck at Overthwaite.  It runs through Beetham where it powers the Heron Corn Mill,  and then flows through the deer park of Dallam Tower before skirting around the south of the village of Milnthorpe and joining the River Kent estuary between Sandside and Milnthorpe.

At its mouth it was formerly crossed by the Sandside Viaduct on the Hincaster Branch Line railway from Arnside to Hincaster, demolished after the line was closed to passengers in 1942 and the track lifted in 1966.

During World War II a prisoner of war camp was built beside the river near Whasset. After the war the camp became an open prison, and there is now a residential school on the site.

Hydro power
The river has been used for power since at least 1096 when there was a watermill at or near the present Heron Corn Mill. It is now used both to power the corn mill and to generate electricity using a Kaplan turbine.

References

External links
 A snippet about the pow camp

Bela, River
Westmorland
1Bela